Makate Must Sell is a 2019 Nollywood movie directed by Don Omope under the production company of Filmone Distribution, Screenart, See Fam and Ahh entertainment The movie that becomes the debut of  Toke Makinwa, a popular on air personality also stars Blossom Chukwujekwu, Akan Nnani, Josh 2 funny, Wofai Fada, Daniel Etim Effiong, Greg Ojefua, and Charles Okocha.

Synopsis 
The story revolves around a lady in her early thirties (Chigul) and her friends decided to get her married in 12 days. The movie unravelled with different questions in her quest to see a suitable man for marriage.

Premiere 
Makate Must Sell was released into Cinemas nationwide on the 3 May 2019.

Cast 
Igwe Tupac, Toyin Abraham, Toke Makinwa, Daniel Etim Effiong, Blossom Chukwujekwu, Bisola Aiyeola, Akan Nnani, Nedu

References 

Nigerian comedy-drama films
English-language Nigerian films